Evan Cole (born 1st of January 1961) is the American founder and CEO of H.D. Buttercup, a home furnishings and interiors retailer with five California locations in Los Angeles (Culver City, Santa Monica and Downtown Arts District, Orange County) and San Francisco (SOMA).  

Born and raised in Queens, New York, Cole attended Boston University when he was 16 years old.

Career
Cole's entrepreneurial journey started when he secured the first-ever licenses to sell IBM personal computers and franchise retail VAR One Hour Photos. He also ran a seasonal holiday store called the Holiday Spirit before entering the home furnishings industry.

In 1982, Cole joined the ABC Carpet Store on 19th and Broadway in New York. He expanded the product line by adding an eclectic mix of rugs, antiques, linens, bodums, furniture, lighting and accessories from his travels around the world. He founded ABC Home in 1985 and opened their first restaurant in 1997. Through combining unexpected pieces together, juxtaposing a variety of decorating styles, and multi-layering, Cole introduced the home as fashion concept. He created a mix and match fashion aesthetic that had never been done with furniture. In 1994, Cole received the NRF (National Retail Federation) Retailer of the Year award.

As Chief Executive of ABC Carpet and Home, Cole was responsible for the company's annual revenue growth from $3 million in 1982 to $170 million in 2004, when he left the company.
In 2005, Evan opened the first H.D. Buttercup store in the historic Helms Bakery complex in Los Angeles. Over 100,000 square feet of maple floors, redbrick walls and 30-foot exposed beams, the open layout store is powered by solar electricity, carries furniture, gifts and accessories. In addition to in-house lines the space houses showrooms of top designers including Timothy Oulton, Andrew Martin, Stark Carpet, Lillian August and Cisco Brothers, making it a popular destination with interior designers.

In 2010, Evan Cole opened a 500 square feet H.D. Buttercup store in the SOMA neighborhood (South of Market, San Francisco) of San Francisco.

In 2014, H.D. Buttercup opened at 44,000 sq.ft store at the SOCO design centre in Costa Mesa in Orange County . 

In 2015, H.D. Buttercup opened a 25,000 square feet store in Santa Monica at the former Fred Segal store, and a new 30,000 square feet worldwide headquarters and company store in the Arts District in Downtown LA housing a completely new urban style. 

Cole is an active real estate investor. In 2011, he put it on the market for $9 million. Cole was cited by Conde Nast Portfolio Magazine as Personal Finance Winner in the December 2008 issue.

Awards
NRF (National Retail Federation) Retailer of the Year Award, 1994 
Personal Finance Winner, Portfolio Magazine, December 2008.

References

Levine, D., Smart Investor in Real Estate, Evan Cole, Conde Nast Portfolio, December 2008, p. 58.

External links
H.D. Buttercup

Living people
American retail chief executives
1961 births